Central Rama 9 (previously known as CentralPlaza Grand Rama 9) is a shopping mall on Rama IX Road in Huai Khwang District, Bangkok. and Opposite Tesco Lotus and Fortune Town Rama IX

Overview
The shopping mall has a total of 9 storeys including 2 basement floors which provide direct connection to Phra Ram 9 MRT Station. The anchor tenants include Robinson department store, SFX cinema, Tops Market, SuperSports, B2S, Office Mate and PowerBuy.

Anchor 
 Robinson Department Store (Moved from Robinson Ratchadaphisek)
 Tops
 Tops Wine Cellar
 Office Mate
 B2S
 B2S Think Space
 B2S (Basement floor)
 Power Buy
 Supersports
 Food Republic
 FamilyMart
 Harborland (Opening Soon)
 SFX Cinema 11 Cinemas
 Fitness First
 MRT Blue Line Phra Ram 9 Station

See also
 List of shopping malls in Thailand

Notes

References

External links 
 Central Rama 9 - official page
 Modulo Language School Homepage

Shopping malls in Bangkok
Central Pattana
Shopping malls established in 2011
2011 establishments in Thailand